The 2015 Sedgemoor District Council election took place on Thursday 7 May 2015 as a four-yearly election to elect all members (councillors) of Sedgemoor District Council in the English county of Somerset.  The principal town in the district is Bridgwater accounting for 15 of the 48 councillors elected. The election was part of the 2015 United Kingdom local elections which were held simultaneously with the 2015 General Election.

Composition of council seats before election

After the 2011 District Council election, 31 councillors were Conservatives, 13 were Labour, 2 were Liberal Democrats and there were 2 independents.

Election results

|-bgcolor=#F6F6F6
| colspan=2 style="text-align: right; margin-right: 1em" | Total
| style="text-align: right;" | 48
| colspan=5 |
| style="text-align: right;" | 92,692
| style="text-align: right;" | 
|-

Candidates by ward
Sedgemoor District Council continued to be made up of 48 councillors elected in 23 different wards, each electing between one and three councillors.

32 incumbent councillors stood again in the wards they represented before this election (denoted by a *).

Axevale Ward (2 seats)

Berrow Ward (1 seat)

Bridgwater Dunwear Ward (2 seats)

Bridgwater Eastover Ward (2 seats)

Bridgwater Fairfax Ward (3 seats)

Bridgwater Hamp Ward (2 seats)

Bridgwater Victoria Ward (2 seats)

Bridgwater Westover Ward (2 seats)

Bridgwater Wyndham Ward (2 seats)

Burnham Central Ward (3 seats)

Burnham North Ward (3 seats)

Cannington & Wembdon Ward (2 seats)

Cheddar & Shipham Ward (3 seats)

East Poldens Ward (1 seat)

Highbridge & Burnham Marine Ward (3 seats)

Huntspill & Pawlett Ward (1 seat)

Kings Isle Ward (2 seats)

Knoll Ward (2 seats)

North Petherton (3 seats)

Puriton & Woolavington Ward (2 seats)

Quantocks Ward (2 seats)

Wedmore & Mark Ward (2 seats)

West Poldens Ward (1 seat)

External links
Election results 2015: Full Sedgemoor District Council Results

References

2015 English local elections
May 2015 events in the United Kingdom
2015
2010s in Somerset